Lowell School or James Russell Lowell School may refer to:

 Lowell School (Boise, Idaho)
 James Russell Lowell Elementary School, Louisville, Kentucky, listed on the NRHP in Jefferson County, Kentucky
 Lowell School (Cambridge, Massachusetts)
 Lowell School (St. Louis, Missouri), listed on the NRHP in St. Louis, Missouri
 James Russell Lowell School (Philadelphia, Pennsylvania)
 Lowell School (Washington, DC)

See also
 Lowell Elementary School (disambiguation)